Vergissmeinnicht is the German for Forget-me-not.

"Vergissmeinnicht", song attributed to Mozart
"Vergissmeinnicht", poem by Franz von Schober 
"Vergissmeinnicht", song by Schubert May 1823 A flat major D792
"Vergissmeinnicht", song by Schoenberg; "War ein Blumlein wunderfein"
"Vergissmeinnicht", poem by Keith Douglas 
Vergissmeinnicht (Eisbrecher song)
Vergißmeinnicht, WAB 93, cantata composed by Anton Bruckner in 1845